Robert John McIntosh (September 16, 1922 – March 22, 2008) was an attorney, pilot, and politician from the U.S. state of Michigan.

McIntosh was born in Port Huron, Michigan and graduated from Port Huron High School in 1940. He attended Michigan State University, East Lansing from 1940 to 1944. He received a J.D. from the University of Michigan Law School in 1948, and in the same year was admitted to the bar and commenced the practice of law in Port Huron.

McIntosh served in the United States Air Force from 1942 to 1945 and was assigned to the Eighth Air Force in England as a fighter pilot. He served as assistant prosecuting attorney of Saint Clair County from 1949 to 1951 and as postmaster at Port Huron from October 1, 1953, to February 4, 1955. McIntosh was a member of the U.S. House of Representatives' Committee on Un-American Activities (HUAC).

In 1956, McIntosh was elected as a Republican from Michigan's 7th congressional district to the 85th United States Congress, serving from January 3, 1957, to January 3, 1959. McIntosh did not vote on the Civil Rights Act of 1957. He was an unsuccessful candidate for reelection in 1958 and again in 1960, being defeated both times by Democrat James G. O'Hara.

In 1963, McIntosh served as chairman of the Michigan State Public Service Commission. He also served as executive assistant to Michigan Governor George W. Romney from 1964 to 1965 and as director of the Michigan Department of Commerce in 1966. He resumed the practice of law and was a resident of Port Huron, Michigan, and Vero Beach, Florida.

McIntosh died in Fort Gratiot, Michigan, on March 22, 2008. He was buried at Lakeside Cemetery in Port Huron.

See also
 List of members of the House Un-American Activities Committee

Notes

References

Robert J. McIntosh at The Political Graveyard

1922 births
2008 deaths
People from Port Huron, Michigan
Republican Party members of the United States House of Representatives from Michigan
Michigan postmasters
20th-century American politicians
Michigan lawyers
Michigan State University alumni
University of Michigan Law School alumni
Military personnel from Michigan
United States Army Air Forces pilots of World War II
20th-century American lawyers